Francis Bebey (15 July 1929 in Douala, Cameroon – 28 May 2001 in Paris, France) was a Cameroonian writer and composer.

Early life
Francis Bebey was born in Douala, Cameroon, on 15 July 1929. Bebey attended college in Douala, where he studied mathematics, before going to study broadcasting at the University of Paris. Moving to the United States, he continued to study broadcasting at New York University. In 1957, Bebey moved to Ghana at the invitation of Kwame Nkrumah, and took a job as a broadcaster.

Music career
In the early 1960s, Bebey moved to France and started work in the arts, establishing himself as a musician, sculptor, and writer. He was also the first African musician to use electric keyboards and programmable drum machines which he set alongside off the traditional African instruments. His most popular novel was Agatha Moudio's Son. While working at UNESCO from 1961-74, he was able to become the head of the music department in Paris. This job allowed him to research and document traditional African music.

Bebey released his first album in 1969. Bebey released over 20 albums on Ozileka, between 1975 and 1997. His music was primarily guitar-based, but he integrated traditional African instruments and synthesizers as well. Though Bebey is currently praised for his music, his musical taste created controversy with his native music when he first started off. His style merged Cameroonian makossa with classical guitar, jazz, and pop, and was considered by critics to be groundbreaking, "intellectual, humorous, and profoundly sensual". He sang in Duala, English, and French.  

Bebey helped launch the career of Manu Dibango. Bebey released more than 20 albums over his career, and was also known for his poetry, including Black tears (1963), a poem dedicated to the March on Washington for Jobs and Freedom.

Bebey had a major role in popularizing the n'dehou, a one-note bamboo flute created by the Central African pygmies. Due to their isolated habitats, a lot is not known about the pygmies but Bebey took it upon himself to learn more about their culture from the African pygmies themselves, especially their music and then shared that knowledge with the world.

Literary career

Bebey wrote novels, poetry, plays, tales, short stories, and nonfiction works. He began his literary career as a journalist in the 1950s and at one time worked as a journalist in Ghana and other African countries for the French radio network, Société de radiodiffusion de la France d'outre-mer (SORAFOM).

Bebey's first novel, Le Fils d'Agatha Moudio (Agatha Moudio's Son), was published in 1967 and awarded the Grand prix littéraire d'Afrique noire in 1968; it remains his best-known work. His novel, L'Enfant pluie (The Child of Rain), published in 1994, was awarded the Prize Saint Exupéry.

In addition to exploring childhood and adult experiences in his works, Bebey also wrote tales drawn from the African oral tradition.

Death and legacy
Bebey died in Paris, France, on 28 May 2001. His survivors include his children Patrick, Toups, and Kidi Bebey, and his wife.

John Williams' piece "Hello Francis" is written as a tribute to Bebey: "The piece is based on the Makossa, a popular dance rhythm from Cameroon often used by Francis, and includes a quote from his piece The Magic Box and a hidden bit of J.S. Bach."

Arcade Fire's song, "Everything Now," features a flute part from "The Coffee Cola Song" by Francis Bebey. The flute part was played by Patrick Bebey, Francis Bebey's son.

Awards
Francis Bebey was awarded the Grand Prix de la Mémoire of the GPLA 2013 for his literary legacy. The Grand Prix de la Mémoire is an award dedicated to major writers of contemporary Cameroonian literature who have died. He was also awarded the Grand Prix Litteraire De L'Afrique Noire in 1968 for his first novel Le Fils d'Agatha Moudio (Agatha Moudio's Son).  The Grand Prix Litteraire De L'Afrique Noire is a literary prize for Black Africa. His novel L'Enfant pluie (Rain Child) won the Prix Saint Exupéry in 1994. The Prix Saint Exupéry award is given to writers whose books love young people and the young people love their books.

Discography

Albums

 Concert Pour Un Vieux Masque, LP, Philips, 1968
 Savannah Georgia, LP, Fiesta Records, 1975
 Guitare D'Une Autre Rime, LP, Ozileka, 1975
 La Condition Masculine, LP, Ozileka, 1976
 Fleur Tropicale, LP, Ozileka, 1976
 Je Vous Aime Zaime Zaime, LP, Ozileka, 1977
 Ballades Africaines, LP, Ozileka, 1978
 Priere Aux Masques. LP, Ozileka, 1979
 Un Petit Ivoirien, LP, Ozileka, 1979
 Afrikanischer Frühling, LP, Marifon, 1980
 Haïti - Guitar Music Trio, LP, Ozileka, 1981
 Bia So Nika, LP, Ozileka, 1981
 Africa Sanza, Ozileka, 1982
 New Track, Ozileka, 1982
 Pygmy Love Song, LP, Editions Makossa, 1982
 Super Bebey - Vingt Plages Ensoleillées, 2xLP, Ozileka, 1983
 Sanza Nocturne, Ozileka, 1984
 Akwaaba: Music For Sanza, Original Music, 1984
 Le Solo De Bruxelles, LP, Ozileka, 1985
 Heavy Ghetto, Anti Apartheid Makossa, LP, Ozileka, 1985
 Si Les Gaulois Avaient Su!, LP, Blue Silver, 1986
 Baobab, LP, Volume, 1988
 African Woman, LP, Volume, 1988
 World Music Guitar, CD, Ozileka, 1992
 Sourire De Lune, CD, Ozileka, 1996

Compilations

 Rire Africain, Ozileka, 1981
 Nadolo / With Love - Francis Bebey Works: 1963-1994, CD, Original Music, 1995 
 African Electronic Music 1975-1982, LP/CD, Born Bad Records, 2011
 Psychedelic Sanza 1982-1984, LP/CD, Born Bad Records, 2014
 La Condition Masculine, CD, Sonodisc

Bibliography

Works by Bebey

 La Radiodiffusion en Afrique noire, 1963 (English translation: Broadcasting in Black Africa)
 Le Fils d'Agatha Moudio, 1967 (English translation: Agatha Moudio's Son)
 Embarras de Cie: nouvelles et poèmes, 1968
 Trois petits cireurs, 1972 (English translation: Three Little Shoeshine Boys)
 La Poupée Ashanti, 1973 (English translation: The Ashanti Doll)
 Le Roi Albert d'Effidi, 1976 (English translation: King Albert)
 Musique de l'Afrique, 1969 (English translation: African Music: A People's Art)
 Le Ministre et le griot, 1992 (English translation: The Minister and the Griot)
 L'Enfant pluie, 1994 (English translation: Rain Child)

See also
 Grand Prix of Literary Associations
 Grands prix des associations littéraires

Notes

References

1929 births
2001 deaths
People from Douala
Cameroonian artists
Cameroonian guitarists
Cameroonian male writers
People of French Equatorial Africa
University of Paris alumni
20th-century Cameroonian sculptors
Cameroonian expatriates in France